Pernambuco falando para o mundo is the third album recorded by the Brazilian musician Antonio Nóbrega. Released in 1998 and produced by himself, the album presents several songs composed according to Pernambuco folklore. This is the reason for the name of the album, which can be translated for English as Pernambuco speaking to the world.

Track listing

Personnel
Antonio Nóbrega: vocals, rebec, violin
Isaar França : vocals
Karina Buhr : vocals
Renata Mattar : vocals
Telma César : vocals
Antônio Bombarda : accordion
Oswaldinho do Acordeon (Oswaldo de Almeida) : accordion
Edmilson Capelupi : cavaquinho, violacho, 7 string acoustic guitar
Marco Cesar de Oliveira Brito : viola, mandolin, cavaquinho
Cláudio Faria : trumpet
Enok Chagas : trumpet
Daniel Allain : flute, piccolo
Eugênia Nóbrega : flute, piccolo
Gilberto : tenor saxophone
Jotagê Alves : bass clarinet
Nilsinho Amarante : trombone
Renato Farias : trombone, euphonium
Spok (Inaldo Cavalcante de Albuquerque) : alto saxophone
Adriano Busko : percussion
Bré : percussion
Gabriel Almeida : percussion
Zezinho Pitoco (José Alves Sobrinho) : snare drum, clarinet, alto saxophone, tenor saxophone

References

1998 albums
Antonio Nóbrega albums